The Purari (also known as Puraari) is a river that originates in the south central highlands especially in Kandep District of Enga Province  of Papua New Guinea, flowing  though Gulf Province to the Gulf of Papua. The Purari has a  drainage basin and is the third largest river in Papua New Guinea. The discharge varies through the year, averaging around – at the delta.

History
The headwaters of the river were charted in 1930 by Michael Leahy and Michael Dwyer.

Geography 
It is fed mainly by the Kaugel, Erave, Lai, Tua and Pio rivers, starting just south of Mount Karimui at the junction of the Tua and Pio rivers, where it flows through a quite spectacular gorge before flowing out into the lowlands and delta country closer to the coast. River becomes  tidal at substantial distance from the waters of Gulf of Papua.
The Purari is a heavy muddy brown from silts washed down from the mountains, and rises and falls constantly depending on local rainfall.

Delta
The Purari Delta is one of a number of large deltaic complexes which border the Gulf of Papua. Along with the Fly, the Kikori and many other rivers, the Purari drains the western and central highland region of Papua New Guinea. These inputs provide the material for a major deltaic complex of global significance.

Tributary

Purari River List of Tributaries by length.

 Wahgi River 
 Erave River 
 Tua River 
 Kaugel River 
 Zogi River

Biodiversity
The general area is heavy tropical jungle with high rainfall and abundant bird life.

Economy
Along the river in various places there are small human populations, mostly subsistence villages. Dugout canoes are seen along the river from Wabo downstream, however population is sparse until you get closer to the coast where there are a few more villages.

Hydroelectric plant
The governments of Papua New Guinea and Government of Queensland have signed a Memorandum of Cooperation with PNG Energy Developments Ltd (PNG EDL) and Origin Energy (Origin) to support the potential development of a renewable hydro electricity project based on the Purari (Wabo Dam).

See also
Purari language
Papua New Guinea

References

External links
 

Rivers of Papua New Guinea
Gulf of Papua